The Golden State Collegiate Baseball League (GSCBL) is a collegiate wood-bat baseball league based out of San Jose, California.  It is a 5-team league that was created in 2012 following the folding of the Pacific West Baseball League, and features teams from California and Nevada.  It is run as a professional baseball league, but only showcases the top college athletes that gives professional scouts a chance to see prospects.

History

The Pacific West Baseball League (PWBL) was a short-lived, 10-team, wooden bat, collegiate summer baseball league founded in 2009.  It was a showcase for top college-level players, giving professional baseball scouts a chance to see prospective pros playing against each other.  The PWBL had franchises in Alameda, Atwater, Auburn, Fresno, Lodi, Sacramento, Salinas, San Rafael, San Francisco, and Carson City, Nevada.  The PWBL was formed of two divisions, with each franchise playing a 31 game league schedule.  The league folded in 2012 and led to the creation of the GSCBL, where many of the teams continued to play.

Current teams
The GSCBL has one division with each franchise playing a 42-game schedule, but the teams are encouraged to play 8 to 10 non-league contests to get around 50 games a season.

Former teams

External links
 GSCBL official website

Summer baseball leagues
College baseball leagues in the United States
Baseball leagues in California
Baseball leagues in Nevada
Baseball leagues in Oregon
2012 establishments in the United States
Sports leagues established in 2012